Aleksandr Aleksandrovich Selikhov (born 7 April 1994) is a Russian football player who plays as a goalkeeper for Spartak Moscow and the Russian national football team.

Club career

FC Oryol
He made his debut in the Russian Second Division for Rusichi Oryol on 29 May 2012 in a game against FC Kaluga.

Amkar Perm
After a loan spell with Russian Football Premier League club Amkar Perm, in July 2014 he signed 2-year deal for Amkar. He made his Russian Football Premier League debut for Amkar in a game against FC Rostov on 28 August 2015 when the first two goalkeeping choices for Amkar, Roman Gerus and Dmitri Khomich were injured.

Spartak Moscow
On 22 November 2016, he signed a contract with Spartak Moscow that began on 6 December 2016, he continued to play for Amkar until that date. Following injury to Artem Rebrov in September 2017 during a UEFA Champions League 1-1 home match against Liverpool, Selikhov impressed with his performances and became the first choice goalkeeper for the remainder of the season. 

In May 2018, Selikhov was injured, forcing him to lose his place in the starting 11 and also miss out on the inclusion to the Russia national team's final squad for the 2018 FIFA World Cup. After completing his recovery, he became only a second choice to Aleksandr Maksimenko and at times plated for the reserve team. Maksimienko remained a starter until a streak of unsatisfactory performances and was replaced by Selikhov in October 2021.

On 9 December 2021, Selikhov saved a stoppage time penalty to keep his side 0-1 up against Legia Warsaw and at the top of the Europa league group, which was so close that even a tie would result in Spartak's elimination.

On 14 October 2022, Selikhov extended his contract with Spartak until the end of the 2024–25 season, with an automatic one-year extension clause if certain conditions are met.

International career
Selikhov earned 6 caps for the U-21 national team between 2014 and 2016.

He played his first match for the Russian national team on 17 November 2022 in an away friendly draw against Tajikistan, during which he kept a clean sheet.

Career statistics

Club

International

Club Honours

Spartak Moscow

Russian Premier League: 2016-17
Russian Super Cup: 2017

References

External links
 
 

1994 births
Sportspeople from Oryol Oblast
Living people
Russian footballers
Russia under-21 international footballers
Russia international footballers
Association football goalkeepers
FC Oryol players
FC Amkar Perm players
FC Spartak-2 Moscow players
FC Spartak Moscow players
Russian Premier League players
Russian First League players
Russian Second League players